Tuset Street is a 1968 Spanish musical film directed by Jorge Grau and Luis Marquina and starring Sara Montiel, Patrick Bauchau and Teresa Gimpera.

Cast
 Sara Montiel as Violeta Riscal  
 Patrick Bauchau as Jorge Artigas  
 Teresa Gimpera as Teresa  
 Jacinto Esteva as Mik  
 Emma Cohen as Mariona 
 Luis García Berlanga as Aparicio  
 Jaume Picas as Llongueras  
 Tomás Torres as Oriel  
 Adrià Gual 
 Óscar Pellicer as Pesa  
 Francisco Barnaba 
 Milagros Guijarro
 Alfredo Landa as Cheering Man in Audience

References

Bibliography
 Bentley, Bernard. A Companion to Spanish Cinema. Boydell & Brewer 2008.

External links 

1968 films
Spanish musical films
1968 musical films
1960s Spanish-language films
Films directed by Jorge Grau
Films set in Barcelona
Films with screenplays by Rafael Azcona
Films scored by Augusto Algueró
1960s Spanish films